This is a list of notable people from San Jose, California. It includes people who were born/raised in, lived in, or spent portions of their lives in San Jose, or for whom San Jose is a significant part of their identity, as well as music groups founded in San Jose. This list is in alphabetical order by surname.

Actors and entertainment industry 
 Elisa Marina Alvarado, Chicana director, actress, educator, born in San Jose
 Frank Bacon, actor, playwright and father of Lloyd Bacon, raised in San Jose and lived there for 17 years
 Lloyd Bacon, Hollywood director, son of actor Frank Bacon, born in San Jose
 Adrienne Barbeau, actress, attended Del Mar High School class of 1963
 Calum Best, British television personality, son of footballer George Best, born in San Jose 
 Brett Dalton, actor, born in San Jose
 Vernon Dent, comedy actor in numerous Three Stooges shorts, born in San Jose
 Rosanna DeSoto, actress, born in San Jose
 Dustin Diamond, child actor, known as Screech from Saved By The Bell, born in San Jose
 Ricco Fajardo, voice actor in Danganronpa 3: The End of Hope's Peak High School and various anime, TV actor, born in San Jose
 Renée Elise Goldsberry, actress, known for originating the role of Angelica Schuyler in the Broadway musical Hamilton, born in San Jose
 Michael Gough, voice actor, born in San Jose
 Farley Granger, actor, best known for Strangers on a Train, born in San Jose
 Nick Groff, paranormal investigator and television personality, born in San Jose
 Krazy George Henderson, cheerleader, inventor of "The Wave", sports entertainment
 Josh Holloway, actor, Lost, born in San Jose
 Fran Jeffries, singer and actress, born in Palo Alto
 Anjelah Johnson, comedian, born in San Jose
 Neil Kaplan, voice actor, attended elementary school, jr. high, and high school in San Jose
 Jeannie Mai, TV personality, talk show host, fashion expert, makeup artist, born in San Jose
 Peverell Marley, Oscar-nominated, Golden Globe-winning cinematographer, born in San Jose
 Charles Martinet, actor and voice actor, best known for providing the voice of Nintendo's Mario, born in San Jose
 Candi Milo, voice actress, born in San Jose
 Linda Park, actress, originally from Seoul, South Korea and raised in San Jose 
 Miguel Perez, actor, born in San Jose
 Kurtwood Smith, actor, That '70s Show
 Smothers Brothers, musical comedy duo and actors
 Ernie Reyes Jr., actor and martial artist, born in San Jose
 Diane Rodriguez, theatre director, actor, writer, born in San Jose
 Dave Tatsuno, Japanese-American internment camp resident who made amateur film Topaz, about camp life
 Kathy Uyen, actress and producer for Vietnamese cinema, born in San Jose
 Kate Walsh, actress, born in San Jose
 Luis Valdez, playwright and director
 Kung Fu Vampire, musician, also on the Discovery Channel's "Oddities", born in San Jose
Akhil Akkineni, Indian-American actor who predominantly works in Telugu film Industry of India.

Artists

Comics and zines 
 Brent Anderson, comic artist with DC Comics, born in San Jose
 Jan Eliot, comic artist of Stone Soup, born in San Jose
 Julia Kaye, comic artist of Up and Out, illustrator, raised in San Jose
 Jhonen Vasquez, creator of alternative comics for Slave Labor Graphics and Invader ZIM, born in San Jose

Mixed media 
 Susan O'Malley (artist), public art, museum curation, and author, raised in San Jose.

Painters 
 Lucy Bacon, Impressionist painter lived in San Jose from 1898 until 1909, taught at the Washburn Preparatory School.
 James Caprell, fine artist, born in San Jose
Ernest de Saisset, portrait artist.
 Chris Johanson, fine artist part of the Mission School art movement, born in San Jose
 Bill Koeb, illustrator and painter, also comics, known for his illustrative work for Clive Barker's Hellraiser series
 Suzanne Scheuer, painter known for her New Deal-era murals, born in San Jose
 Herman Volz, fine artist that worked with the Federal Art Project, lived in San Jose from 1960 to 1990, died in San Jose

Photographers 
 Bill Owens, photographer and photojournalist documenting suburbia, born in San Jose
 Alfred T. Palmer, photographer of Americana during World War II, born in San Jose

Sculptors 
 Ruthadell Anderson, sculptor, fiber artist, textile artist; born in San Jose and attended San Jose State University.
Therese May, fine art quilting, lived in San Jose

Athletes 

 Aly Wagner, retired soccer player
 Yorgo Alexandrou, Olympic bobsledder for Armenia (two-man bobsleigh, 2002 Salt Lake City), born and raised in San Jose
 Chidobe Awuzie NFL player, born in San Jose
 Scott Baker, Major League Baseball player, born in San Jose
 Isaac Brizuela, footballer, born in San Jose
 Brent Burns, pro hockey player San Jose Sharks, lives in San Jose
 Steve Caballero, professional skateboarder, born in San Jose
 Mark Canha, baseball player, born in San Jose
 Ken Caminiti, pro baseball player (San Jose State), 1996 NL MVP
 Rich Campbell, NFL player, played high school football in San Jose
 John Carlos, Olympic silver medalist, 200m (1968 Mexico City); track and field athlete; pro football player
 Andre Carter, pro football player
 Henry Cejudo, 2012 Olympic gold medalist in freestyle wrestling, MMA fighter, born in San Jose
 Brandi Chastain, soccer player, World Cup champion, born in San Jose
 Amy Chow, Olympic gold medalist in gymnastics (1996), born in San Jose
 Kay Cockerill, professional golfer, born in San Jose
 Jerry Coleman, decorated combat pilot, MLB player and manager, Ford Frick Award-winning sportscaster, born in San Jose
 Angelo Caloiaro (born 1989), American-Italian basketball player in the Israeli Basketball Premier League
 Michelle Do, Olympic table tennis player
 Polina Edmunds, Olympic figure skater
 Herman Edwards, NFL player, coach, TV commentator
 Jon Fitch, UFC fighter
 Peggy Fleming, 1968 Winter Olympics figure skating gold medalist, born in San Jose
 Rudy Galindo, national champion figure skater, born in San Jose
 Jeff Garcia, pro football quarterback (San Jose State)
 Jeremy Giambi, baseball player, born in San Jose
 Dan Gladden, baseball player, two-time World Series champion (1987, 1991 with Minnesota Twins), born in San Jose
 Aaron Gordon, player for the Denver Nuggets and brother of Drew Gordon, born in San Jose
 Drew Gordon, player for the Philadelphia 76ers and brother of Aaron Gordon, born in San Jose
 Shawn Green, MLB 2-time All-Star outfielder
 Dany Heatley, pro hockey player, San Jose Sharks
 Mike Holmgren, NFL coach and executive
Cass Jackson, former college football head coach, one of the first African-American head football coaches at a predominantly white college (Oberlin College).
 John Johnson, NBA basketball, First Team All American at the University of Iowa, lived and died in San Jose
 Brent Jones, football player, Santa Clara University, San Francisco 49ers, three-time Super Bowl champion, born in San Jose
 James Jones, pro football player (San Jose State), Green Bay Packers, Oakland Raiders, born in San Jose
 Carney Lansford, pro baseball player, Oakland A's, 1989 World Series champion, 1981 A.L. batting champion, born in San Jose
 Joe Leonard, automobile and motorcycle champion
 Cung Le, Vietnamese mixed martial arts fighter, three-time Sanshou bronze medalist
 Roger Maltbie, professional PGA golfer and NBC Sports On Air golf analyst
 Patrick Marleau, pro hockey player, San Jose Sharks
 Kyle McLaren, pro hockey player San Jose Sharks
 Tommy Medica, baseball player, born in San Jose
 Marty Mornhinweg, NFL player and coach
 Evgeni Nabokov, pro hockey player, San Jose Sharks
 James Nunnally (born 1990), professional basketball player for Maccabi Tel Aviv of the Israeli Basketball Premier League and the Euroleague, and formerly in the NBA, born in San Jose
 Brian Oldfield, athlete, world and American record holder in shot put
 Jesús Padilla, soccer player for Chivas de Guadalajara, born in San Jose
 Jim Plunkett, quarterback, Stanford University, 1970 Heisman Trophy winner, Oakland Raiders, two-time Super Bowl champion (SB XV MVP), born in San Jose
 John Powell, two-time Olympic bronze medalist (1976 Munich, 1984 L.A.), discus throw
 Dave Righetti, baseball player; 1981 A.L. Rookie of the Year (N.Y. Yankees); pitched no-hitter on July 4, 1983; San Francisco Giants pitching coach, born in San Jose
 Ricco Rodriguez, mixed martial artist, UFC and ADCC champion, born in San Jose
 Frank Shamrock, MMA fighter
 Tommie Smith, Olympic gold medalist - 200m, (1968 Mexico City), track and field athlete (San Jose State), pro football player
 Dave Stieb, pro baseball pitcher
 Carl Sullivan, football player, born in San Jose
 Mike Swain, Olympic gold medalist, four-time Olympian, San Jose State judo coach
 Mike Swick, UFC fighter
 Josh Thomson, mixed martial artist and model, born in San Jose
 Joe Thornton, pro hockey player, San Jose Sharks
 Pat Tillman, pro football player and decorated Army Ranger, born in San Jose
 Debi Thomas, Olympic figure skater, grew up in San Jose
 Loren Toews, pro football player
 Yosh Uchida, businessman, educator, contributor to San Jose State judo team, born in San Jose
 Cain Velasquez, MMA fighter
 Dick Vermeil, college and pro football head coach, Super Bowl champion (St. Louis Rams, 1999)
 Bill Walsh, college and pro football head coach, three-time Super Bowl champion (San Francisco 49ers)
 Bayley, WWE wrestler
 Jake McGee, Professional Baseball Player

Business leaders and entrepreneurs 
 Gurbaksh Chahal, entrepreneur
 Andy Dinh,  entrepreneur and professional gamer, born in San Jose
 Amadeo Peter Giannini, founder of Bank of America, born in San Jose
 Steve Jobs, co-founder and former CEO of Apple Inc., lived in San Jose
 Donald Snyder, investment banker, born in San Jose
 Peter Ueberroth, sports and business executive, San Jose State University alumnus 
 Ken Williams, MLB executive, general manager for 2005 World Series champion Chicago White Sox
 Steve Wozniak, co-founder of Apple Inc., born in San Jose
 Jerry Yang, co-founder of Yahoo!

Chefs 
 Angela Dimayuga, internationally known chef born and raised in San Jose

Dancers 
 Mythili Kumar, South Indian traditional dancer of Bharatanatyam, resides in San Jose, founder of Abhinaya Dance School of San Jose
 Yuriko Kikuchi (née Amemiya), worked with the Martha Graham Dance Company, born in San Jose

Designers 
 Mai Kitazawa Arbegast, landscape architect, born in San Jose
 Scott Campbell, video game concept artist for LucasArts then Double Fine Productions, art director, comic artist and illustration, born and raised in San Jose
 Theodore Lenzen, Prussian-born architect, active in San Jose
 Joe Murray, animator, born in San Jose
 Emily Williams, pioneering female architect in the 20th century, attended California State Normal School (later known as SJSU)

Musicians and bands 
 Antwon, rapper, lives in San Jose
 Ashe (singer), singer, born in San Jose
 Bassnectar, DJ and electronic music producer
 Louie Bellson, professional drummer
 Tommy Castro, blues, rock
 Charizma, rapper, born in San Jose
 Count five, garage rock band, formed in San Jose
 John "Sean" Byrne, musician with Count five, lived in San Jose
 Irene Dalis, opera singer, founder of Opera San Jose, born in San Jose
 Jimmy DeGrasso, heavy metal drummer
 DJ Shadow, born Joshua Davis, instrumental hip-hop DJ, born in San Jose
 The Doobie Brothers, rock band
 Tom Johnston, lived in San Jose with the Doobie Brothers
 Fleetwood Mac, rock band
 Lindsey Buckingham, musician with Fleetwood Mac
 Stevie Nicks, singer and musician with Fleetwood Mac
 Jeff Foskett, guitarist and singer, best known for work with The Beach Boys
 Getter, DJ, electronic music producer and rapper
 Heavy Heavy Low Low, metal band formed in San Jose
 Antony Hegarty, frontwoman of Antony and the Johnsons
 The Holdup, reggae and hip hop band formed in San Jose
 Greg Kihn, rock musician and radio DJ
 Kung Fu Vampire, rapper from San Jose
 Los Tigres del Norte, Mexican band formed in San Jose
Laura Mam - musician and music industry entrepreneur
 Bryan Mantia, drummer for Primus and Guns N' Roses, born in San Jose
 Kamtin Mohager, lead musician for The Chain Gang of 1974
 No Use for a Name, band
Matt Riddle, bassist of No Use for a Name, born in San Jose
 Tony Sly, lead singer and guitarist of No Use for a Name, born in San Jose
 Peanut Butter Wolf, disc jockey and producer from San Jose
 Plavka, international singing star, born in San Jose
 Nikki Sixx, bassist for Mötley Crüe, born in San Jose
 Sleep, doom metal band formed in San Jose
 Smash Mouth, pop-rock band formed in San Jose
 Snow Tha Product, rapper, born in San Jose
 Skip Spence, co-founder of Moby Grape
 Stone Temple Pilots, band
 Eric Kretz, drummer for Stone Temple Pilots, Talk Show, and Spiralarms, born in San Jose
 Scott Weiland, vocalist for Stone Temple Pilots, Velvet Revolver, Camp Freddy, The Wondergirls, Art of Anarchy, and The Magnificent Bastards, born in San Jose
 Randy Stonehill, singer/songwriter, born in San Jose
 Syndicate of Sound, garage rock band formed in San Jose
 Traxamillion, rapper
 Xiu Xiu (band), avant-garde band formed in San Jose
 Yvette Young, singer/songwriter, guitarist/front-woman of Covet
 Kim Yubin, member of South Korean girl group Wonder Girls
 Quinn Godfrey, member of grunge rock band Heatmiser

Politicians, civil servants and activists 

 César Chávez, American labor leader and civil rights activist
 C. C. Cottrell, 1933 to 1939 California State Assembly member
 Nathan Damigo, founder of Identity Evropa an American neo-Nazi and white supremacist organization, grew up in San Jose.
 Don Edwards, U.S. Representative from California 1963–1995, born in San Jose
 Thomas Fallon, soldier, Mayor of San Jose
 Ron Gonzales, Mayor of Sunnyvale, Mayor of San Jose
 Mike Honda, U.S. Representative
 Sherman Otis Houghton, Mayor of San Jose, U.S. Representative
 Norman Mineta, Mayor of San Jose, United States Secretary of Transportation, United States Secretary of Commerce, born in San Jose
 James F. Reed, organizer of the Donner Party, businessman and soldier
 Michael A. Rice, biologist and Rhode Island politician, born in San Jose
 Iola Williams, politician and civil rights activist, first African-American to serve on San Jose City Council (1979–1991), Vice Mayor of San Jose for two terms

Scientists 
 Edgar F. Codd, computer scientist
 Dian Fossey, primatologist, SJSU graduate
 Dudley R. Herschbach, winner of the 1986 Nobel Prize in Chemistry, born in San Jose
 Michio Kaku, physicist, born in San Jose

Writers 
 Reza Aslan, Iranian-American author, religious studies scholar, producer, and television host; attended Del Mar High School (class of 1990)
 Tad Williams, author of the Memory, Sorrow, and Thorn series.
Raymond Carver, American short story writer and poet
Carolyn Cassady, author of the Beat Generation, lived in San Jose
 Neal Cassady, author of the Beat Generation, Merry Pranksters member, inspiration for character Dean Moriarty in Jack Kerouac's novel On The Road, lived in San Jose
 Howard Dully, author, My Lobotomy
 Kate Elliott, novelist
 Khaled Hosseini, best-selling novelist, author of The Kite Runner, lived in San Jose
 William Lewis Manly, pioneer, hero, banker, and author of Death Valley in '49
 Viet Thanh Nguyen, author of The Sympathizer, winner of the 2016 Pulitzer Prize in Fiction; attended Bellarmine College Preparatory
 James Wesley Rawles, novelist
 Al Ruffo, Mayor of San Jose
 Kay Ryan, poet, former Poet Laureate of the United States, born in San Jose
 Amy Tan, best-selling novelist, author of The Joy Luck Club
 Louis Theroux, English documentary filmmaker, journalist and broadcaster
 Jeanne Wakatsuki Houston, author of the memoirs Farewell to Manzanar, attended high school and college in San Jose

Journalists 
 Francis B. Murdoch, founder and publisher of the San Jose Weekly Telegraph (1853–1860) and the San Jose Weekly Patriot (1863–1875)

 Vicky Nguyen, NBC News anchor

Other 
 Isai Alvarado, professional video game player, Super Smash Bros. player
 Susan Atkins, convicted murderer, Manson Family member
 Joey Chestnut, competitive eater
 Jason Dahl, captain of United Airlines Flight 93 on September 11, 2001, born in San Jose
 David Marius Guardino, psychic
 Henry Morris Naglee, U.S. Civil War general and served in the Mexican–American War
 Matt Stonie, competitive eater, born in San Jose
 Henry Suzzallo, educator
 Rick Warren, pastor 
 Sarah Winchester, heiress to the Winchester Rifle Company, occultist, architect to the Winchester Mystery House, lived in San Jose
 Matt Field, Formula D driver

See also 

 List of people from Oakland, California
 List of people from Palo Alto
 List of people from San Francisco, California
 List of people from Santa Cruz, California

References

 
San Jose
San Jose
People